Assuério Silva (born June 18, 1974) is a Brazilian mixed martial artist and professional boxer, having competed in the Ultimate Fighting Championship and Pancrase.  He became the Heavyweight King of Pancrase on May 30, 2007, defeating Tatsuya Mizuno.

Mixed martial arts career
Silva holds a professional fight record of 15–8–01, the majority of his wins coming via submission.  He fought three times in Pride FC in 2001, winning twice.  However, after signing a three-fight contract with UFC, he was less successful, losing all his fights to Tim Sylvia, Brandon Vera and Cheick Kongo.

His height is 6 ft 1 in and he weighs 241 pounds. In addition to training Muay Thai, he holds a black belt in karate.  Silva is also a Black Belt in Jiu Jitsu under Cristiano Marcello.  He fights out of Curitiba, Brazil with Total Punch Mixed Martial Arts Academy.

Silva bounced back from a loss to Cheick Kongo by becoming the King of Pancrase after a 2nd-round TKO win over Tatsuya Mizuno. He won this vacated title at Pancrase Rising 6 last 30 May 2007. He was scheduled to defend the championship against the former champion, Kestutis "Tiger" Arbocius, on 14 October 2007 at the Differ Ariake Arena in Tokyo, Japan, but Arbocius no-showed at the event.  Shortly thereafter, Silva vacated the Championship to pursue a contract with the newly formed Hardcore Fighting Championships in Canada. However, the organization folded before he was able to fight once under their banner.

Silva made his professional boxing debut on June 21, 2008 in his native Curitiba, Brazil, knocking out Adriano Vicente in 38 seconds of the 1st round.

Shooting incident
Silva was shot on the evening of January 29, 2013 outside his gym in Curitiba, Brazil, according to a report from Brazilian news outlet Parana Online.  Silva was allegedly shot five times by a former associate, whom Silva reportedly identified as Robson Freitas. Silva was reportedly taken to a local hospital and was in serious condition for a period of time.

Championships and accomplishments

Mixed martial arts
 Pancrase Hybrid Wrestling 
Pancrase Heavyweight Championship (One time; Last)

Mixed martial arts record

|-
| Loss
| align=center| 16–8 (1)
| Geronimo dos Santos
| KO (punches)
| Jungle Fight 16
| 
| align=center| 1
| align=center| 1:01
| Rio de Janeiro, Brazil
| 
|-
| Win
| align=center| 16–7 (1)
| Dave Anderton
| Submission (guillotine choke)
| Boa Vista Combat Show
| 
| align=center| 1
| align=center| 0:53
| Boa Vista, Roraima, Brazil
| 
|-
| Loss
| align=center| 15–7 (1)
| Todd Duffee
| TKO (punches)
| Jungle Fight 11
| 
| align=center| 2
| align=center| 1:17
| Rio de Janeiro, Brazil
| 
|-
| Win
| align=center| 15–6 (1)
| Terroll Dees
| Submission (kneebar)
| Jungle Fight 10
| 
| align=center| 1
| align=center| 1:42
| Rio de Janeiro, Brazil
| 
|-
| Win
| align=center| 14–6 (1)
| Tatsuya Mizuno
| TKO (punches)
| Pancrase: Rising 5
| 
| align=center| 2
| align=center| 2:08
| Tokyo, Japan
| 
|-
| Loss
| align=center| 13–6 (1)
| Cheick Kongo
| Decision (majority)
| UFC 70
| 
| align=center| 3
| align=center| 5:00
| Manchester, England
| 
|-
| Win
| align=center| 13–5 (1)
| Igor Pokrajac
| Decision (split)
| Jungle Fight Europe
| 
| align=center| 3
| align=center| 5:00
| Ljubljana, Slovenia
| 
|-
| Win
| align=center| 12–5 (1)
| Eduardo Maiorino
| TKO (punches)
| Show Fight 5
| 
| align=center| 1
| align=center| N/A
| Sao Paulo, Brazil
| 
|-
| Loss
| align=center| 11–5 (1)
| Brandon Vera
| Submission (guillotine choke)
| UFC 60: Hughes vs. Gracie
| 
| align=center| 1
| align=center| 2:39
| Los Angeles, California, United States
| 
|-
| Loss
| align=center| 11–4 (1)
| Tim Sylvia
| Decision (unanimous)
| UFC Fight Night 3
| 
| align=center| 3
| align=center| 5:00
| Las Vegas, Nevada, United States
| 
|-
| Win
| align=center| 11–3 (1)
| Alessio Sakara
| Decision (unanimous)
| Jungle Fight 3
| 
| align=center| 3
| align=center| 5:00
| Manaus, Amazonas, Brazil
| 
|-
| Win
| align=center| 10–3 (1)
| Fabiano Scherner
| Submission (guillotine choke)
| Jungle Fight 2
| 
| align=center| 2
| align=center| 1:00
| Manaus, Amazonas, Brazil
| 
|-
| Loss
| align=center| 9–3 (1)
| Alexander Emelianenko
| Decision (split)
| Pride Bushido 1
| 
| align=center| 2
| align=center| 5:00
| Saitama, Japan
| 
|-
| NC
| align=center| 9–2 (1)
| Fabiano Scherner
| No Contest (injury)
| Meca World Vale Tudo 9
| 
| align=center| 3
| align=center| 1:24
| Rio de Janeiro, Brazil
| 
|-
| Win
| align=center| 9–2
| Yoshihisa Yamamoto
| TKO (punches)
| Pride 16
| 
| align=center| 1
| align=center| 0:11
| Osaka, Japan
| 
|-
| Win
| align=center| 8–2
| Valentijn Overeem
| Submission (heel hook)
| Pride 15
| 
| align=center| 1
| align=center| 2:50
| Saitama, Japan
| 
|-
| Win
| align=center| 7–2
| Walter Farias
| KO (head kick)
| Meca World Vale Tudo 5
| 
| align=center| 1
| align=center| 5:00
| Curitiba, Parana, Brazil
| 
|-
| Win
| align=center| 6–2
| Pedro Otavio
| Submission (strikes)
| Meca World Vale Tudo 4
| 
| align=center| 2
| align=center| 2:00
| Curitiba, Parana, Brazil
| 
|-
| Win
| align=center| 5–2
| Rodrigo Mamute
| Submission (punches and stomp)
| Meca World Vale Tudo 2
| 
| align=center| 1
| align=center| 4:27
| Curitiba, Parana, Brazil
| 
|-
| Win
| align=center| 4–2
| Luis Alberto
| Submission
| Desafio: BadBoy de ValeTudo 2
| 
| align=center| N/A
| align=center| N/A
| Ceara, Brazil
| 
|-
| Win
| align=center| 3–2
| Leopoldo Serao
| KO
| Desafio: BadBoy de ValeTudo 2
| 
| align=center| N/A
| align=center| N/A
| Ceara, Brazil
| 
|-
| Win
| align=center| 2–2
| Romildo Romialdo
| Submission (rear-naked choke)
| MOVT 2: Mossoro Open de Vale Tudo 2 
| 
| align=center| 1
| align=center| N/A
| Mossoro, Brazil
| 
|-
| Loss
| align=center| 1–2
| Mikhail Avetisyan
| TKO (cut)
| World Vale Tudo Championship 7
| 
| align=center| 1
| align=center| 8:58
| Brazil
| 
|-
| Win
| align=center| 1–1
| Waldir dos Anjos
| Submission (rear naked choke)
| BVF 12: Circuito Brasileiro de Vale Tudo 4
| 
| align=center| 1
| align=center| 11:07
| Brazil
| 
|-
| Loss
| align=center| 0–1
| Charles Gracie
| Submission (triangle choke)
| Extremo Combate Bahia Open
| 
| align=center| 1
| align=center| 1:01
| Salvador, Bahia, Brazil
|

References

External links
 
 

1974 births
Living people
Brazilian male mixed martial artists
Heavyweight mixed martial artists
Mixed martial artists utilizing boxing
Mixed martial artists utilizing Muay Thai
Mixed martial artists utilizing Shotokan
Mixed martial artists utilizing Brazilian jiu-jitsu
Heavyweight boxers
Brazilian practitioners of Brazilian jiu-jitsu
People awarded a black belt in Brazilian jiu-jitsu
Brazilian male karateka
Sportspeople from Rio Grande do Norte
Brazilian male boxers
Brazilian Muay Thai practitioners
Ultimate Fighting Championship male fighters
20th-century Brazilian people
21st-century Brazilian people